Russian Defence may refer to:

Ruy Lopez#Russian Defence
Petrov's Defence (Russische Verteidigung)

See also 

Ministry of Defence (Russia)